Lakshmipur Government College (LGC) is a public college located in Lakshmipur, Bangladesh. It offers higher-secondary education (HSC). It has Bachelor's degree and Master's degree programs as well which divisions are affiliated to the University of Chittagong since Feb 16, 2016. Among 685 colleges under National University, Lakshmipur Government College has been ranked 8th according to National University Ranking of honours & masters in 2015 in Chittagong division.

References 

Universities and colleges in Lakshmipur District
1961 establishments in East Pakistan